George Keyports Brady (December 9, 1838 – January 20, 1899) was an officer in the United States Army who served as the second commander of the Department of Alaska, from September 1, 1870, to September 22, 1870.

Early life
Brady was born in Chambersburg, Pennsylvania, on December 9, 1838.  He was the son of Jasper Ewing Brady, a lawyer who later served as a Whig member of the U.S. House of Representatives from Pennsylvania, and whose uncles included noted Indian fighters Samuel Brady and Hugh Brady.

Civil War
At the outbreak of the Civil War, Brady enlisted as a private in the 12th Pennsylvania Infantry.  On July 8, 1861, he accepted a commission as a first lieutenant in the Regular Army's 14th Infantry Regiment.  He served in this regiment throughout the war, participating in the battles of Gaines' Mill, Malvern Hill, Second Bull Run, Chacellorsville, Gettysburg, the Wilderness, Laurel Hill, Petersburg, and Weldon Railroad.  In the latter battle, he was taken prisoner and held at Libby Prison before being paroled in September 1864.  Brady received a promotion to captain on June 10, 1864, and received a brevet as major for his gallantry at Weldon Railroad on August 18, 1864.  On March 16, 1865, he was brevetted a lieutenant colonel for his meritorious services during the war.

Later career
Immediately after the conclusion of the war, the 14th Infantry was sent to the west coast, where Brady was posted at Camp McDowell, Arizona, accompanied by his wife Henrietta Margaret and their baby daughter.  The baby died in March 1866.  In September 1866, he was transferred to the 23rd Infantry and was posted to Camp Three Forks Owyhee, Idaho, where he took part in the Snake War.  His son, Mifflin Brodhead Brady, was born in Idaho in July 1868.

From July 1869 to May 1871, Brady's company was posted at Sitka, Alaska, and Brady served briefly as commander of the Department of Alaska.  He later served at various posts across the West, including Camp Lowell, Fort Leavenworth, Fort Supply, Fort Union, and Fort Mackinac.

He was promoted to major in the 18th Infantry in March 1886, and was stationed in Denver until May 1889 when he took command of Fort Hays.  He was promoted to  lieutenant colonel in the 17th Infantry in March 1891 and commanded that regiment at Fort D. A. Russell.  Brady retired at his own request on August 16, 1894, and died in Chicago on January 20, 1899.

See also

Governors of Alaska
James H. Brady, a third cousin, was Governor of Idaho, 1909–1911.
Jerry Brady, James H. Brady's great-grandson.

References

External links

1838 births
1899 deaths
American Civil War prisoners of war
American people of the Indian Wars
Burials at Spring Grove Cemetery
Commanders of the Department of Alaska
People from Chambersburg, Pennsylvania
People of Pennsylvania in the American Civil War
Union Army colonels
United States Army officers
19th-century American politicians